Archibald Bell (15 April 1804 – 9 August 1883) was an English-born Australian explorer and politician.

Life and family

Archibald Bell was born on 15 April 1804 in county Hertfordshire, England, the son of Archibald Bell and Maria (née Kitching), one of ten children. He arrived in New South Wales with his family in July 1807 aboard the Young William, his father being an officer of the New South Wales Corps.  Bell married Francis Ann North in 1833 at Windsor; Ann was the daughter of Lieutenant Samuel North, pastoralist and Police Magistrate for Windsor.  Bell maintained his activities as a pastoralist in between explorations of Sydney's north-west.

Exploration

In August 1823 Archibald Bell, aged nineteen years, travelled along the route that would later become the Bell’s Line of Road.  Although the mountains had been crossed at Katoomba a decade earlier, there was still no satisfactory route through the mountains from Richmond at this time.  On the journey from Richmond to Mount Tomah Bell followed the directions of an Aboriginal woman who had travelled the route. Other sources claim Bell was shown the route by the Darug men, Emery and Cogy.  He initially failed to find a safe descent to the west from Mount Tomah, but returned a month later and was able to travel into the Hartley valley where he joined up with Cox's road.  Bell found the greatest difficulty on the journey “was in the thick part of his way to Tomah, so much so that in one place he was forced to cut his way through three miles”.  Bell used the Aboriginal term 'Balcamatta' to describe the country below Mount Tomah where he encountered difficulty proceeding.

Upon his return in September 1823 Archibald Bell sent his report of the route over the Blue Mountains to Governor Brisbane.  Soon afterwards the surveyor-general John Oxley instructed his assistant-surveyor Robert Hoddle to survey Bell's line of road.  Hoddle completed the task and his survey report was submitted in November 1823. The road across the mountains was soon afterwards cleared and formed by convict labour.

Bell also explored the Hunter River and saved the explorers Howe and Singleton from starvation. He specialized in breeding horses for coaching and hackney horses. He was granted  on the Hunter River near Belford in 1839. He had other estates in the Hunter Valley and moved from Corinda to Milgarra at Bunnan near Scone in 1849. In 1859 he bought Pickering at Denman, an  freehold estate on the Hunter River. He lived there until his death on 9 August 1883.

Bell represented Upper Hunter in the New South Wales Legislative Assembly from 1868 to 1872 and was appointed to the Legislative Council for life in 1879.

The township of Bell, Mount Bell, the Bell Range and Bells Line of Road were named after the explorer.

References

 

1804 births
1883 deaths
Australian explorers
Members of the New South Wales Legislative Assembly
Members of the New South Wales Legislative Council
People from the Hunter Region
19th-century Australian politicians